Vera Chok is a Malaysian actress and writer based in the United Kingdom, who has featured in various stage, screen and radio roles. Since December 2021, she has played Honour Chen-Williams in the Channel 4 soap opera Hollyoaks.

Early and personal life
Chok was born in Petaling Jaya, Malaysia, of Chinese ancestry. After attending Assunta Primary and Secondary schools in Malaysia and Abbots Bromley School in Staffordshire, she graduated from The Queen's College, Oxford, before training as an actor at the Poor School in London and with Philippe Gaulier in Paris. Chok identifies as queer and uses she/they pronouns.

Career
Chok's main theatre roles have included parts in the award-winning Lucy Kirkwood play Chimerica (2013), as part of the original cast at the Almeida and Harold Pinter theatres and in The World of Extreme Happiness (The Shed at the National Theatre, 2013), in which she co-starred with Katie Leung. Chok played the part of Ming Ming, a female migrant worker, in a production about the world of migrant workers in rapidly emerging modern China. Vera Chok also appeared in the TV miniseries version of Chimerica on Channel 4 in 2019, alongside Katie Leung.

In 2015, Chok appeared in Nicholas Hytner's final production as artistic director for the National Theatre, Tom Stoppard's The Hard Problem. The play was Stoppard's first for the theatre since 2006 and a special screening was broadcast live to cinemas. She subsequently had roles in the Kenneth Branagh Theatre Company production of The Winter's Tale at the Garrick Theatre in late 2015  and an associated work, Terence Rattigan's Harlequinade, also at the Garrick, which humorously depicts a postwar CEMA-sponsored theatrical troop at a provincial theatre in Brackley making a hash of Romeo and Juliet and "the intrigues and dalliances of the company members".

Chok was nominated in the 2015 BBC Audio Drama Awards (Best Debut Performance In An Audio Drama) for her performance in the BBC Radio 3 production of British Chinese novelist Xiaolu Guo's first play, Dostoevsky And The Chickens (2014), in which she co-starred. In Liao Yimei's comedy drama Rhinoceros in Love, also for Radio 3, she plays the beautiful Mingming, the object of a zookeeper's longing, in a performance described by the Sunday Times as 'bewitching'.

She appeared in Jingo (2008, Finborough Theatre, London) and played the lead role of Lila in the stage adaptation of Philip Pullman's The Firework-Maker's Daughter (2011, Theatre by the Lake) - described by The Stage as a 'poignant performance'.

In addition, Chok has appeared in a number of independent and main release films, in the long-running ITV series Coronation Street and in TV dramas for the BBC, Netflix and Sky.

Whatsonstage.com named her one of "15 theatre faces to look out for in 2015". Asked by the magazine to give her advice on International Women's Day, Chok said "Play the long game: stay open, generous, and keep developing your craft."

In 2016, she contributed a chapter to the widely publicised anthology of the personal accounts of members of immigrant and ethnic minorities in the UK, 'The Good Immigrant'. Writing about her experiences as a Malaysian immigrant in Britain in the Guardian during Black History Month, Chok commented on the invisibility of 'East Asian' groups in Britain: "In the UK media, we don’t see south Asians portrayed in a way that reflects their position as the largest racial minority group in the UK (3 million to 1.9 million black British). East Asians, the third-largest and fastest-growing racial group at 1.2 million, people bear the damning “model minority” label which isolates them from other people of colour, and condemns them to an invisibility where violence against them is ignored." Writing in British Chinese journal Neehao in 2017, she urged British Chinese and East Asian actors not to take on parts that reinforce anti-China sentiment at a time when " ...Asians in America, in LIBERAL states, are being beaten up because of anti-China rhetoric from D(onald) T(rump)."

In 2020, Chok played the Red Queen in Creation Theatre's online (through Oxford Theatre) version of Alice, which won a 2021 Offie for best platform-based work.

She wrote a play for online, Rice!, broadcast on Zoom in 2021, a co-production between Omnibus Theatre and Malaysian company Wayang Kitchen, which featured a distributed Malaysian meal to cook at home with tutorial help, plus a play broadcast from Kuala Lumpur and Wiltshire, according to The Stage "an elegant proposition: playing to audiences in both the UK and Malaysia, this story about migration and belonging unfolds while we cook congee with meal kits provided by the company".

In December 2021, Chok began playing Honour Chen-Williams, a prison psychiatrist, in the British TV soap Hollyoaks. Her character is one of parents of the newly introduced Chen-Williams family, alongside her delivery driver husband Dave, played by Dominic Power. Chok told media that “Dave and Honour have a very large brood, so it's a really solid relationship. They've been together for a long while and brought up this really adorable blended family".

Producing
In 2010, Chok founded saltpeter, an independent theatre company. She produced and starred in their opera production Tonseisha - The Man Who Abandoned the World (2014 - Studio, Central Saint Martins), which is adapted from the play by Erik Patterson. In the work, which features opera, dance and theatre, Chok played Yukiko, a Japanese woman haunted by the losses of her father and Beat writer Richard Brautigan. In 2011, she founded the Brautigan Book Club, which stimulates creative explorations based on Brautigan's work.

Filmography

Film

Television

Radio

Theatre

External links
 
 
 Vera Chok on Twitter
 Spotlight Actresses 2013/17 - Vera Chok

References

British actresses of Chinese descent
British people of Chinese descent
British radio actresses
British stage actresses
British voice actresses
Malaysian actresses
Living people
Malaysian people of Chinese descent
British people of Malaysian descent
Year of birth missing (living people)
Alumni of The Queen's College, Oxford
People educated at Abbots Bromley School for Girls
Queer actresses
British LGBT actors